Doña Victoria Eugenia Fernández de Córdoba y Fernández de Henestrosa, 18th Duchess of Medinaceli, Grandee of Spain (16 April 1917 – 18 August 2013) was the 18th Duchess of Medinaceli in her own right and a Grandee of Spain, head of the Spanish noble House of Medinaceli and patron of the Ducal House of Medinaceli Foundation. She died in Seville on 18 August 2013, aged 96.

Background
Doña Victoria was born as the eldest daughter of Don Luis Jesús Fernández de Córdoba y Salabert, 17th Duke of Medinaceli, and Doña Ana María Fernández de Henestrosa y Gayoso de los Cobos. She married Rafael de Medina y Vilallonga in 1938, and she succeeded to the dukedom in 1956, upon her father's death. Before that, she was styled as 16th Duchess of Alcalá de los Gazules, a courtesy title granted by her father. She was the most titled noblewoman in Spain, and holder of one of its most ancient dukedoms.

In 1980, the Duchess established the Ducal House of Medinaceli Foundation, which manages the Casa de Pilatos in Seville, her principal residence, as well as the Hospital de San Juan Bautista in Toledo and the Palacio de Oca in Galicia.

Marriage and issue
The Duchess married, on 12 January 1938 at Seville, Rafael de Medina y Vilallonga, Knight of the Real Maestranza de Caballería de Sevilla and Mayor of Seville from 1943–47. The Duke was son of Luis de Medina y Garvey, second son of the 4th Marquis of Esquivel, and Amelia de Vilallonga e Ybarra. Children:

Doña Ana Luisa de Medina y Fernández de Córdoba, 12th Marquise of Navahermosa (b. 2 May 1940 - d. 7 March 2012), who married firstly at Seville, the 3 June 1961, Prince Maximilian Emmanuel of Hohenlohe-Langenburg, of the Hohenlohe princely family, brother of Prince Alfonso of Hohenlohe-Langenburg. Divorced in 1982, she married secondly, in 1985, Jaime de Urzáiz y Fernández del Castillo, Minister of Culture. Children from her first marriage:
Prince Marco of Hohenlohe-Langenburg, 19th Duke of Medinaceli (b. 8 March 1962 - d. 19 August 2016), married at Ronda, on 1 June 1996, Sandra Schmidt-Polex, daughter of Hans Carl Schmidt-Polex, and Karin Goepfer, having issue.
Prince Pablo of Hohenlohe-Langenburg (b. 5 March 1963), married at Tavera Monastery, Toledo on 6 June 2002, María del Prado y Muguiro, daughter of Juan Carlos del Prado, 11th Marquis of Caicedo, and Teresa de Muguiro y Pidal, having issue.
Princess Flavia of Hohenlohe-Langenburg (b. 9 March 1964), married at Seville, on 10 November 1990, her second cousin José Luis de Vilallonga y Sanz, having issue.
Don Luis de Medina y Fernández de Córdoba, 9th Duke of Santisteban del Puerto, Grandee of Spain (b. 4 June 1941 - d. 9 Feb 2011), who married at Seville, on 1 December 1985, Mercedes Conradi y Ramírez. Daughters:
Doña Victoria Francisca de Medina y Conradi y Ramírez (b. 4 October 1986), 10th Duchess of Santisteban del Puerto, Grandee of Spain, married at Sevilla in 2014, Miguel José Coca y Barrionuevo.
Doña Casilda de Medina y Conradi y Ramírez (b. 16 May 1989), 16th Marchioness of Solera.
Don Rafael de Medina y Fernández de Córdoba, 19th Duke of Feria, Grandee of Spain (b. 10 August 1942 - d. 5 August 2001), married at the Hermitage of El Rocío, Almonte, Natividad Abascal y Romero-Toro (divorced in 1989). Children:
Don Rafael de Medina, 20th Duke of Feria, Grandee of Spain (b. 25 September 1978).
Don Luis de Medina y Abascal (b. 31 August 1980).
Don Ignacio de Medina y Fernández de Córdoba, 19th Duke of Segorbe, Grandee of Spain (b. 23 February 1947), married at Seville, on 24 October 1985, Princess Maria da Glória of Orléans-Braganza, daughter of Prince Pedro Gastão of Orléans-Braganza and wife Princess Maria de la Esperanza of Bourbon-Two Sicilies and ex-wife of Alexander, Crown Prince of Yugoslavia. Daughters:
Doña Sol María de la Blanca de Medina y Orléans-Braganza, 54th Countess of Ampurias (b. 8 August 1986).
Doña Ana Luna de Medina y Orléans-Braganza, 17th Countess of Ricla (b. 4 May 1988).

Titles

Dukedoms

18th Duchess of Medinaceli, Grandee of Spain
18th Duchess of Segorbe, Grandee of Spain -Ceded to her son Don Ignacio
16th Duchess of Alcalá de los Gazules, Grandee of Spain
18th Duchess of Feria, Grandee of Spain -Ceded to her son Don Rafael
12th Duchess of Camiña, Grandee of Spain
8th Duchess of Santisteban del Puerto, Grandee of Spain -Ceded to her son Don Luis
13th Duchess of Ciudad Real, Grandee of Spain
4th Duchess of Denia, Grandee of Spain
4th Duchess of Tarifa, Grandee of Spain

Marquessates
17th Marchioness of Priego, Grandee of Spain
17th Marchioness of Camarasa, Grandee of Spain
14th Marchioness of Aitona, Grandee of Spain
11th Marchioness of la Torrecilla, Grandee of Spain
17th Marchioness of Denia 
20th Marchioness of Pallars 
17th Marchioness of Comares 
19th Marchioness of Tarifa 
17th Marchioness of las Navas 
15th Marchioness of Villalba -Ceded to her son Don Rafael
14th Marchioness of Alcalá de la Alameda 
15th Marchioness of Villafranca 
14th Marchioness of Malagón 
15th Marchioness of Montalbán 
13th Marchioness of Solera -Ceded to her son Don Luis
11th Marchioness of Navahermosa -Ceded to her daughter Doña Ana
14th Marchioness of Cilleruelo 
9th Marchioness of San Miguel das Penas and la Mota

Countships
17th Countess of Santa Gadea, Grandee of Spain
52nd Countess of Ampurias -Ceded to her son Don Ignacio
26th Countess of Prades 
22nd Countess of Osona 
22nd Countess of Castrojeriz 
20th Countess of Cocentaina 
19th Countess of Medellín 
19th Countess of the Risco
24th Countess of Buendía 
19th Countess of the Molares, Adelantada Mayor of Andalusia 
14th Countess of Villalonso 
16th Countess of Castellar 
15th Countess of Ricla -Ceded to her son Don Ignacio
14th Countess of Aramayona 
15th Countess of Amarante 
12th Countess of Alcoutim
12th Countess of Valenza and Valladares 
10th Countess of Moriana del Río -Ceded to her son Don Luis
8th Countess of Ofalia -Ceded to her daughter Doña Ana

Viscountcies
46th Viscountess of Bas 
44th Viscountess of Cabrera 
42nd Viscountess of Vilamur
12th Viscountess of Linares

See also 
 Medinaceli

References

External links
Ducal House of Medinaceli Foundation website, fundacionmedinaceli.org; accessed 18 February 2015.
Profile, grandesp.org.uk; accessed 18 February 2015.

1917 births
2013 deaths
Nobility from Madrid
Spanish duchesses
Dukes of Medinaceli
Dukes of Caminha
Victoria Eugenia
Grandees of Spain
People from Seville
Marquesses of Priego